Torre dei Capocci (Engl.: "The Tower of the Capocci") is a tower at San Martino ai Monti square in Rome, Italy.

Description
Torre dei Capocci, along with Torre dei Graziani, constitutes a kind of monumental entrance to top of the hill Esquilino.

History
Built by the family of Arcioni in the 12th century, it afterwards went to the Capocci, a noble family from Viterbo. These erected around the tower a number of houses, which no longer exist, but which made the building a sort of citadel. The terrace, bordered by a brick parapet, is edged by crenellated battlements on each side, and emerges at the output hopper of the staircase.

References

External links 
 Roma Sparita – Torre dei Capocci

Towers completed in the 13th century
Capocci
Rome R. I Monti